The scimitar-winged piha (Lipaugus uropygialis) is a species of bird in the family Cotingidae. It is found in Bolivia and Peru.

Its natural habitat is subtropical or tropical moist montane forests. It is threatened by habitat loss.

References

External links
BirdLife Species Factsheet.

scimitar-winged piha
Birds of the Peruvian Andes
Birds of the Bolivian Andes
scimitar-winged piha
scimitar-winged piha
scimitar-winged piha
Taxonomy articles created by Polbot